Markus Steuerwald (born 7 March 1989) is a German former professional volleyball player, a former member of the Germany national team, a participant at the Olympic Games London 2012, 2006–07 CEV Champions League winner, and a bronze medallist at the 2014 World Championship.

Honours

Clubs
 CEV Champions League 
  2006/2007 – with VfB Friedrichshafen
 CEV Cup
  2013/2014 – with Paris Volley
 National championships
 2006/2007  German Cup, with VfB Friedrichshafen
 2006/2007  German Championship, with VfB Friedrichshafen
 2007/2008  German Cup, with VfB Friedrichshafen
 2007/2008  German Championship, with VfB Friedrichshafen
 2008/2009  German Championship, with VfB Friedrichshafen
 2009/2010  German Championship, with VfB Friedrichshafen
 2013/2014  French SuperCup, with Paris Volley
 2015/2016  French Championship, with Paris Volley
 2016/2017  German SuperCup, with VfB Friedrichshafen
 2016/2017  German Cup, with VfB Friedrichshafen
 2017/2018  German SuperCup, with VfB Friedrichshafen
 2017/2018  German Cup, with VfB Friedrichshafen
 2018/2019  German SuperCup, with VfB Friedrichshafen
 2018/2019  German Cup, with VfB Friedrichshafen

Individual awards
 2007: CEV Champions League – Best Libero
 2007: CEV U19 European Championship – Best Server
 2012: Olympic Games – Best Libero

External links

 
 
 
 Player profile at Volleybox.net

1989 births
Living people
People from Wolfach
Sportspeople from Freiburg (region)
German men's volleyball players
Olympic volleyball players of Germany
Volleyball players at the 2012 Summer Olympics
German expatriate sportspeople in France
Expatriate volleyball players in France
Paris Volley players
Liberos